This timeline is about events during World War II of direct significance to Sweden, which remained officially neutral throughout the war. For a larger perspective, see Timeline of World War II.

Timeline

Sources

Notes

References

 Isadora Donahue helped in this programing

Sweden in World War II
Modern history timelines